Celebrity Big Brother 3 is the third season of the American reality television series Celebrity Big Brother. It premiered on February 2, 2022, on CBS. The show chronicles a group of celebrities (known as HouseGuests) who moved into a house under constant surveillance and with no contact from the outside world. They are competing for power and safety before voting to evict one of their fellow HouseGuests out of the house.

The season concluded on February 23, 2022, where Miesha Tate defeated Todrick Hall by a final jury vote of 7 to 1. Carson Kressley was named America's Favorite HouseGuest.

The season was announced in September 2021 after a two-year hiatus and aired 15 episodes on CBS, as counterprogramming to the 2022 Winter Olympics. Additional content related to the season was released on Paramount+. Julie Chen Moonves returned as host while Allison Grodner and Rich Meehan returned as executive producers. The contestants for the season were announced in January 2022.

Production

Development

The first season of the American version of Celebrity Big Brother aired on CBS in February of the 2017-18 television season as counterprogramming to NBC's coverage of the 2018 Winter Olympics. Due to the success of the series a second season was later ordered that aired in the second half of the 2018-19 television season. Ahead of the twenty-first season of the civilian version in 2019 CBS Entertainment President Kelly Kahl stated that future editions of Celebrity Big Brother were uncertain. In addition, future contracts of host Julie Chen Moonves did not include any mention of Celebrity Big Brother. In December 2020, following the conclusion of the parent series twenty-second season Chen Moonves mentioned in an interview that she and numerous producers encouraged the network to order a third season, believing that then was the time to do it due to the impact of the COVID-19 pandemic. Chen Moonves stated that they declined to order a third season at the time but continued to leave the possibility open for a later time. On September 9, 2021, during the Television Critics Association summer press tour, Thom Sherman, Senior Executive Vice President of CBS programming, announced that Celebrity Big Brother would return for a third season. Chen Moonves is confirmed to be returning as host. Allison Grodner and Rich Meehan will return as executive producers while Fly On The Wall Entertainment and Endemol Shine North America will continue to serve as production companies.

Casting
Compared to previous seasons at least half of the contracted celebrities must be black, indigenous, (and) people of color. The requirement comes from a CBS effort that began in 2020 to bring diversity to reality television series.

Filming
In August 2021 it was reported that ViacomCBS was looking to sell CBS Studio Center in Studio City, California where the Big Brother house is located. When the season was announced it was confirmed that the Big Brother house will feature 94 high definition cameras and 113 microphones although the official location of the studio was not mentioned. Filming began on January 26, 2022.

Production design

The seasons Ski lodge-themed house design was revealed through the series social media accounts and entertainment news websites on January 28, 2022. The entranceway to the house was designed around the Swiss Alpines and features a crystal chandelier that has three-hundred thousand illuminated beads. A living room houses a mid-century firepit in the center of a curved couch and posters advertising Switzerland landmarks. Three bedrooms were designed around Ski patrol, a Cuckoo clock, and Chocolate. The Ski patrol bedroom has a Saint Bernard sign above a barrel of brandy, walls of stacked river stones, and an accent wall full of skis; the Cuckoo clock room has a wall clock with a nine-foot face, an "imposing wooden cuckoo", and other various time-keeping devices; the chocolate-themed bedroom features Swiss chocolate bar headboards, bubblegum rugs, and walls with LED-lit artificial chocolate. The kitchen houses an overhead mural of the Northern lights and an attached dining room features a Saarinen-inspired table. A spiral staircase that has been featured in the house since the sixth season of the civilian version in 2005, and throughout the first two seasons of the celebrity version, has been replaced with a three-landing staircase. On the second floor, the upstairs lounge was designed around a gondola while the Head of Household bedroom parallels an Ice palace. A sauna and gym have also been added to the house.

Prize
The last remaining HouseGuest received . The runner-up received .

Twist

Gala Gift
During the first Head of Household competition, Julie told the HouseGuests of the Gala Gift - which would give someone a blessing and someone a curse. This gift took the form of a handbag styled hat designed by the fictitious fashion designer Mon Won (the apparent designer of all of Big Brother's costumes used for punishments).

Before Nominations, the Housemates participated in a selection process to determine who would receive immunity. Beginning with HoH, Miesha, each HouseGuest would select the next wearer of the Mon Won hat, making them ineligible to receive immunity. The last wearer of the hat would receive Immunity from the first eviction. Cynthia was awarded immunity.

On Eviction Night, a second selection process was held to determine an instant nominee. Beginning with Cynthia, the Mon Won hat would be passed around again among the HouseGuests. The last wearer of the hat would be instantly nominated for that night's eviction. This nominee would replace their choice of either of the HoH's nominees. Miesha, as HoH, Carson, as the PoV holder and Teddi and Mirai as the original nominees did not participate in this process. Todd became the instant nominee and replaced Mirai.

Below is the full selection order for both selections.

Broadcast
At the time of its announcement it was reported that the season would air in February 2022, during the 2021–22 television season, as counterprogramming to the 2022 Winter Olympics. 24/7 Live feeds and additional exclusive content will stream on Paramount+, previously CBS All Access, throughout the season. It was later announced that the season would premiere on February 2 and air through February 23, 2022.

HouseGuests 

The eleven HouseGuests were revealed on January 26, 2022, during a commercial break for the thirty-third season of The Amazing Race. Prior to the reveal, Chen Moonves revealed several clues regarding the identities of the HouseGuests.

Episodes

Voting history

Notes

Reception

Controversy 
Todrick Hall was widely criticized for his comments regarding Shanna Moakler, Chris Kirkpatrick, and other houseguests in the house which were deemed by viewers and critics as mean-spirited. Additionally, Hall received backlash from several former work colleagues for his treatment towards them with allegations of employee negligence regarding pay and behavioral issues being mostly criticised.

Viewing Figures

Notes

References

2022 American television seasons
Big Brother (American TV series)
United States 03